Wilhelm Rudolf Jordan (4 May 1810, Berlin – 20 March 1887, Düsseldorf) was a German genre painter, illustrator, etcher and art teacher.

Biography 
His father was a member of the Judicial Council and he was a descendant of Charles-Étienne Jordan; advisor to Frederick the Great. After completing his basic artistic studies with Karl Wilhelm Wach at his private school in Berlin, Jordan moved to the Kunstakademie Düsseldorf, where he took master classes with Friedrich Wilhelm Schadow and Karl Ferdinand Sohn. In 1837, he became a member of the Prussian Academy of Arts.

He graduated from the Kunstakademie in 1840 and, from 1848, operated his own studio; creating genre scenes and giving lessons. He is considered to be one of the founders of the ethnographic approach to genre painting. During this time, he was named a ""; a largely honorary title.

After 1843, following the success of his painting "Heiratsantrag auf Helgoland" (Marriage Proposal in Helgoland), he devoted himself mostly to portraying fisherman and sailors, which involved frequent journeys to Belgium, Holland and France. Many of these works became popular and were widely disseminated as lithographs and engravings.In 1848, he was one of the founders of "Malkasten", a progressive art society in Düsseldorf. That same year, during the Revolution, he served as a member of the Bürgerwehr (Vigilance committee) under Commander Lorenz Clasen, also a painter by profession.

In 1869, he was awarded the Order of the Red Eagle. A year before his death, he was presented with the Order of the Crown. He was also a recipient of the Commander's Cross in the Order of Vasa.

His first wife, Sophie von Mülmann (1811–1863), was a painter of some note.

Notable students

 Anton Dieffenbach 
 Ernestine Friedrichsen 
 Albert Kindler 
 Heinrich Ludwig Philippi
 Henry Ritter 
 Raphael Ritz 
 Emil Gottlieb Schuback
 Richard Sohn
 Benjamin Vautier
 Josef Wilhelm Wallander

Selected illustrations and paintings
More digitalized illustrations may be found in the corresponding article on German Wikipedia
 K. Stieler, H. Wachenhusen, F.W. Hackländer: Rheinfahrt. Von den Quellen des Rheins bis zum Meere. (From the Source of the Rhine to the Sea), Kröner, Stuttgart 1875. Digitalized online
 Johann Karl Musäus and Julius Ludwig Klee (eds.). Volksmährchen der Deutschen. (Popular Tales) with woodcuts and original drawings, Mayer und Wigand, Leipzig 1842. Digitalized online

Sources 
 "Jordan, Rudolf". In: Hermann Alexander Müller: Biographisches Künstler-Lexikon. Die bekanntesten Zeitgenossen auf dem Gebiet der bildenden Künste aller Länder mit Angabe ihrer Werke. Bibliographisches Institut, Leipzig 1882
 "Jordan, Rudolf". In: Thieme-Becker, Allgemeines Lexikon der Bildenden Künstler von der Antike bis zur Gegenwart. Vol.19, E. A. Seemann, Leipzig 1926, pgs.161–162.
 Hans Paffrath/Kunstmuseum Düsseldorf: Lexikon der Düsseldorfer Malerschule. Vol.2, Bruckmann, München 1998, pgs.193–196

Further reading 
 F.W. Ross, Rudolf Jordan, der Maler Helgolands, weiland Genremaler und Professor zu Düsseldorf. Hannover, Self-published, 1900. Description of his life and art with samples and reviews.

External links 

ArtNet: More works by Jordan.

1810 births
1887 deaths
19th-century German painters
19th-century German male artists
German genre painters
Kunstakademie Düsseldorf alumni
German illustrators
Recipients of the Order of Vasa